Zhu Jian (born May 4, 1991) is a Chinese actor and model. He is best known for his role of king Zhi Ming in the 2016 web series, Men with Sword.

Biography
Zhu was born into a working-class family on May 4, 1991, in Nantong, Jiangsu. He is the second child of the family; he has an older sister. He attended Suzhou Arts and Crafts Institute and studied marketing. After his graduation, he worked for a month as a teacher at an art school, where he taught children how to paint. Later, he opened a clothing store in a shopping mall in his hometown, where he was scouted by a fashion magazine. Zhu modeled for the magazine for two years.

He debuted as an actor in 2016, portraying the childish and naive king Zhi Ming in the all-male web series Men with Sword. Zhu repeated his role in a second season of the series, which was released on June 15, 2017. He also has appeared in web series like Weapon & Soul 2, Untouchable Lovers, Tomb of the Sea, and The Legend of Hao Lan.

On January 7, 2018, he won a Golden Jubilee Award for "Best Web Series Star" of the year.

Personal life 
In March 2017, during a photo session for Men with Sword 2, he was accidentally injured by his co-star Zha Jie with a prop sword, which resulted in a cut in the upper eyelid of his left eye that required five stitches.

Filmography

Web series

Movies

References

External links 

 Official web site

1991 births
Living people
Chinese male television actors
Chinese male film actors
21st-century Chinese male actors